Ryuki Miki and Dorothy Round were the defending champions, but Miki did not compete. Round competed with Fred Perry, and defeated Harry Hopman and Nell Hopman in the final, 7–5, 4–6, 6–2 to win the mixed doubles tennis title at the 1935 Wimbledon Championships.

Seeds

  Gottfried von Cramm /  Hilde Sperling (semifinals)
  André Martin-Legeay /  Sylvie Henrotin (third round)
  Fred Perry /  Dorothy Round (champions)
  Wilmer Allison /  Helen Jacobs (first round)

Draw

Finals

Top half

Section 1

Section 2

Section 3

Section 4

Bottom half

Section 5

The nationality of GE Bean is unknown.

Section 6

Section 7

Section 8

References

External links

X=Mixed Doubles
Wimbledon Championship by year – Mixed doubles